Maximilian Heidenreich (born 9 May 1967 in Hanover, Niedersachsen) is a German football manager and former player who manages SV Weil. He played as a midfielder for various clubs in Germany and Switzerland during the 1980s and 1990s.

References

External links
 
 

Living people
1967 births
Footballers from Hanover
German footballers
Association football midfielders
Germany under-21 international footballers
Bundesliga players
2. Bundesliga players
Hannover 96 players
TSV 1860 Munich players
Eintracht Frankfurt players
FC Basel players
SC Freiburg players
VfL Wolfsburg players
SG Wattenscheid 09 players
German football managers
Freiburger FC managers
German expatriate footballers
German expatriate sportspeople in Switzerland
Expatriate footballers in Switzerland